Atutur General Hospital, also Atutur Hospital, is a government-owned hospital in the Eastern Region of Uganda.

Location
The hospital is located on the Tororo-Mbale-Soroti Road, in the community of Atutur, in Kumi District, in the Teso sub-region, in the Eastern Region of Uganda.

The coordinates of Atutur General Hospital are: 01°24'34.0"N, 33°59'27.0"E (Latitude:1.409437; Longitude:33.990830).

Overview
Atutur General Hospital was built in 1969 to serve the districts of Kumi, Bukedea, Ngora and Pallisa. The hospital infrastructure has deteriorated and the hospital equipment has become obsolete. The hospital is severely understaffed and underfunded.

Renovation
In 2013, the government of Uganda secured a loan from the World Bank, to construct, renovate and equip selected government-owned hospitals, including Aturtur General Hospital.

See also
List of hospitals in Uganda

References

External links
 Website of Uganda Ministry of Health

Hospitals in Uganda
Kumi District
Teso sub-region
Eastern Region, Uganda
1969 establishments in Uganda
Hospital buildings completed in 1969